Sundarban Gas Company Limited is a Bangladesh government owned gas company under Petrobanglaresponsible for distributing gas in South-Western region of Bangladesh.

History 
Sundarban Gas Company Limited was established on 23 November 2009 under Petrobangla. The company is responsible for gas supply in Barishal Division, Khulna Division, and the greater Faridpur region.

In August 2013, the Sundarban Gas Company Limited provided the first home natural gas connection in Bhola District.

On 31 January 2015, Sundarban Gas Distribution Company along with other state owned distribution companies sought permission from Bangladesh Energy Regulatory Commission to double the tariff of household gas supply. The company spent 3.5 billion BDT building pipelines in Southwestern region but the project could not be utilized due to the scarcity of natural gas in the region. The project was shut down in 2016. In 2017, the decision was taken to raise the rate in two phrases. 

In March 2019, Sundarban Gas Distribution Company along with three other state owned distribution companies sought permission from Bangladesh Energy Regulatory Commission to increase the price of the gas they supplied. There was a hearing on the proposed hike and Gano Forum threatened street protests unless the price hike was cancelled.

Nasrul Hamid, the State Minister of the Ministry of Power, Energy and Mineral Resources told in parliament the outstanding bills of the Sundarban Gas Company Limited stood at 1.2 billion BDT in January 2021. 

On 21 January 2022, Sundarban Gas Distribution Company along with other state owned distribution companies sought permission from Bangladesh Energy Regulatory Commission to double the tariff of household gas supply. The company, and other state owned gas companies, make a profit residential connections through the usage of a flat rate and discouraging metered connections.

References 

2009 establishments in Bangladesh
Organisations based in Khulna
Government-owned companies of Bangladesh